The Sixth of April Sarajevo Award is the highest decoration given by the city of Sarajevo. Recipients are awarded for their continuous work and achievements in the fields of science, business, education, technology, health care, art, sports, and human rights. The award is given annually by the City Assembly of Sarajevo.

Background
Military operations in World War II in Yugoslavia began on 6 April 1941, when the Kingdom of Yugoslavia was swiftly conquered by Axis forces and partitioned between Germany, Italy, Hungary, Bulgaria and client regimes. Following a German bombing campaign, Sarajevo, along with the rest of Bosnia and Herzegovina, was conquered by the Ustashe Croatian fascist Independent State of Croatia, a puppet state of Nazi Germany. Many of the city's Serbs, Romani, and Jews were taken at this time and killed in the Holocaust. The city's resistance was led by Yugoslav Partisan commander, Vladimir Perić, known by his nom de guerre Walter. With an Allied victory on the horizon, Adolf Hitler personally issued a directive on 15 February 1945 ordering the holding of Sarajevo. After ferocious fighting the city was finally liberated on 6 April 1945 by the National Liberation Army of Yugoslavia. The date has since been known as Sarajevo City Day. In 1956 the City Assembly of Sarajevo established the Sixth of April Sarajevo Award.

Recipients

1950s

1960s

1970s

1980s

1990s

2000s

2010s

References

Culture in Sarajevo
Bosnia and Herzegovina awards